Trife may refer to: 
 Electoral Tribunal of the Federal Judiciary in Mexico
 Trife Da God, a rapper affiliated with the Wu-Tang Clan
 A short term for triflic or trifluoromethanesulfonic acid, a superacid